Itatiaya is a genus of spiders in the family Zoropsidae. It was first described in 1915 by Mello-Leitão. , it contains 8 species, all found in Brazil.

Species
Itatiaya comprises the following species:
Itatiaya apipema Polotow & Brescovit, 2006
Itatiaya iuba Polotow & Brescovit, 2006
Itatiaya modesta Mello-Leitão, 1915
Itatiaya pucupucu Polotow & Brescovit, 2006
Itatiaya pykyyra Polotow & Brescovit, 2006
Itatiaya tacamby Polotow & Brescovit, 2006
Itatiaya tubixaba Polotow & Brescovit, 2006
Itatiaya ywyty Polotow & Brescovit, 2006

References

Zoropsidae
Araneomorphae genera
Spiders of Brazil